is a prominent Japanese casting director and film producer. She gained prominence due to her involvement with The Last Samurai, Babel, and Memoirs of a Geisha. The Japan Times, the only independent English-language newspaper in Japan, referred to her as an "all-round interpreter of Japan for U.S. movies".

Biography
Born in Ichikawa, Chiba, Japan, Narahashi moved to Montreal, Quebec, Canada in 1952 at the age of five when her father got a job at the International Civil Aviation Organization. She returned to Japan a decade later to attend International Christian University in Mitaka, Tokyo. In 1967, she returned to New York City where she studied at the Neighborhood Playhouse School of the Theatre .

Returning again to Japan, Narahashi founded two companies. The first was an English conversation school (Eikaiwa), Model Language Studio (MLS), which taught English through theater. The school now has branches in 34 countries. The second was a production and management company, United Performers' Studio (UPS), based on the Actors Studio in New York City. In 1998, she served as the founding director of UPS Academy, a method acting school geared towards foreign actors.

Narahashi was once married to Johnny Nomura, the producer behind the popular Japanese band Godiego. She wrote the lyrics for Gandhara, The Galaxy Express 999, and Holy and Bright. They have since been divorced.

Selected filmography

References

External links
 

1947 births
Living people
Casting directors
Women casting directors
International Christian University alumni
Japanese film producers
Japanese women film producers
Japanese theatre directors
Japanese lyricists
Neighborhood Playhouse School of the Theatre alumni
Japanese voice directors